Ministry of Coordination was a former ministry in Turkey. The ministry was founded during the 23rd government of Turkey on 10 July 1958. Its purpose was to coordinate the economic activities of the other ministries. However during the formation of the 24th government of Turkey it was abolished. Its mission was handed over to the State Planning Organization

The minister of Coordination

References

1958 establishments in Turkey
1960 disestablishments in Turkey
Coordination
Ministries established in 1958
Ministries disestablished in 1960